Gennaro Joseph "Jerry" Angiulo Sr. (March 20, 1919 – August 29, 2009) was an American mobster who rose to the position of underboss in the Patriarca crime family of New England under Raymond L. S. Patriarca. Angiulo was convicted of racketeering in 1986 and was imprisoned until being released in 2007. One of the Angiulo Brothers, he was "probably the last very significant Mafia boss in Boston’s history".

Early life
Gennaro J. Angiulo was born in 1919 to Italian immigrants Cesare and Giovannina "Jeannie" (née Fimiani) Angiulo, who owned a mom-and-pop grocery store. He grew up with his siblings Nicolo, Donato, Francesco, Antonio, Michele and James. Even though he was from the North End neighborhood, he graduated from Boston English High School in 1936, where his ambition was to attend Suffolk Law School and become a criminal lawyer. Gennaro Angiulo enlisted in the U.S. Navy at the beginning of World War II and served 4 years in the Pacific theater; he achieved the rank of Chief Boatswain's Mate. Upon completion of his service, he moved back to the North End of Boston. He had a regular table in the back room of an Italian dinery called Francesca's Restaurant on North Washington Street in North End, Boston.

Mob career
The Angiulo brothers who had only minor previous involvement in crime realized that as a result of convictions of previous operators there was an opening for numbers game operation. They offered small business people such as barbers and convenience store owners the opportunity to get a wholesale discount on bets on individual numbers. The Angiulo brothers were able to build a network converting these businesses into points of sale and bookies. This succeeded in attracting the interest of the Mafia and the Angiulo brothers offered the Patriarca family a cut rather than resist them.

The Angiulo brothers, who owned nightclubs, were publicly named as members of Cosa Nostra, more commonly known as the American Mafia. In 1963, Gennaro's reputation for being a shrewd businessman, along with his successful racketeering, led to Patriarca appointing him underboss of the Providence, Rhode Island-based Patriarca crime family. Angiulo later headed up Boston's underworld from the 1960s to the 1980s. He and his brothers ran the criminal organization out of their headquarters at 98 Prince Street in the North End, the neighborhood in which he grew up.

Capture

Arrest
In 1981, the Federal Bureau of Investigation (FBI) placed wiretaps in the headquarters and at a nearby social club, located at 51 North Margin Street, for three months. It was later revealed in a federal court that rival gangsters Whitey Bulger and Stephen Flemmi drew a diagram for FBI agents telling them where to plant the bugs. As Angiulo was being taken in handcuffs from the restaurant on September 19, 1983, he yelled, "I'll be back before my pork chops get cold."

Trial
As Angiulo sat in jail without bail awaiting trial on federal racketeering charges, he was demoted from the mob.

At the highly publicized trial, jurors heard hours of taped conversations of Angiulo and his associates planning numerous illegal activities, including murder, gambling, loan sharking and extortion. In one conversation, Angiulo ordered the killing of a bartender after concluding that he was set to testify before a federal grand jury investigating gambling and loan-sharking. The FBI thwarted the plot by warning the witness.

At the eight-month-long trial, the mobster often sarcastically commented on the evidence presented and cracked jokes, prompting District Court Judge David Nelson to repeatedly reprimand him.

Sentence and later life
In February 1986, Angiulo and his co-defendants were convicted of "an avalanche of charges". He was sentenced to 45 years in prison on 12 counts of racketeering, gambling, loan sharking, and obstruction of justice. As his own lawyer, Angiulo argued numerous times, unsuccessfully, to have his conviction overturned. One argument claimed that he was framed by the FBI, Bulger, and Flemmi.

In an affidavit filed in federal court in 2004, he wrote that he was in poor health and his term was "tantamount to an illegal death sentence". Angiulo, who had been incarcerated at the federal prison hospital in Devens, was paroled on September 10, 2007. He had been undergoing dialysis treatment since his release while living at his waterfront home in Nahant. Prior to his death, he was spending time with his wife, Barbara, with whom he had three children, Jason Brion, Gennaro Jay Jr., and Barbara Jay Angiulo.

Angiulo died on August 29, 2009, at the Massachusetts General Hospital of kidney failure from kidney disease. His funeral was at the Joseph A. Langone Jr. Funeral Home in Boston's North End.

In popular culture
In the Whitey Bulger biopic Black Mass (2015), Angiulo is portrayed by Bill Haims.

References

Sources
 
 

 

1919 births
2009 deaths
20th-century American criminals
American male criminals
American gangsters of Italian descent
American prisoners and detainees
Deaths from kidney failure
Patriarca crime family
Gangsters from Boston
People from North End, Boston
United States Navy chiefs
United States Navy personnel of World War II